Gaetano de Vito (9 June 1884 – 7 February 1964) was an Italian painter.

Biography
Filippo Palizzi was born in San Salvo in the province of Chieti of Abruzzo. Educated in the elementary school of San Salvo and the Middle School of Vasto, he moved to study at the technical institute in Taormina, Sicily. From there he enrolled at the Royal Institute of Fine Arts in Naples, initially under Filippo Palizzi. After graduating, in 1914, he obtained a teacher's degree at the Scuole Tecniche. Hew was named professor of Design for the Scuole Tecniche  of Chieti.

He joined the army during the World War I and distinguished himself as a sub-lieutenant in the Battle for Monte Grappa. He was awarded a Medal of Bronze and a Cross of War. During World War II, he served as a captain in the army. he befriended the painter Luigi Martella, poet Romualdo Pantini, among the cultured salons of Vasto. During the 1950s and 1960s, he was named giudice conciliatore onorario of Vasto.

After the war, he quite teaching and dedicated himself to painting rural scenes, inspired by Palizzi. He died in San Salvo.

References

20th-century Italian painters
20th-century Italian male artists
Italian male painters
Painters from Naples
1884 births
1964 deaths
Accademia di Belle Arti di Napoli alumni